Colin Burgess (born 1947) is an Australian author and historian, specializing in space flight and military history.  He is a former customer service manager for Qantas Airways, and a regular contributor to the collectSPACE online community. He lives in New South Wales. 

Two of Burgess's co-authored 2007 books, Into That Silent Sea: Trailblazers of the Space Era, 1961–1965 and In the Shadow of the Moon: A Challenging Journey to Tranquility, 1965–1969 were named as finalists for the 2007 Eugene M. Emme Award given by the American Astronautical Society. 

In the Shadow of the Moon was also named as "2009 Outstanding Academic Title" by Choice Magazine.

Bibliography
 Aircraft, 1985
 Pioneers of Flight, 1988
Prisoners of War, with Hugh Clarke and Russell Braddon, 1988
 Laughter in the Air: Tales from the Qantas Era, with Max Harris, 1988
 More Laughter in the Air: Tales from the Qantas Era, 1992
 Barbed Wire and Bamboo: Australian POW Stories, with Hugh Clarke, 1993
 Freedom or Death : Australia's Greatest Escape Stories from Two World Wars, 1994
 Destination Buchenwald, 1995. Revised and expanded edition published 2022 
 The Diggers of Colditz: the classic Australian POW escape story now completely revised and expanded, with Jack Champ, 1997 and 2019
 Australia's Dambusters: The Men and Missions of 617 Squadron, 2003, re-released in 2021
 Bush Parker: An Australian Battle of Britain Pilot in Colditz, 2007, 
 Space, the New Frontier, 1987
 Oceans to Orbit: The Story of Australia's First Man in Space, Paul Scully-Power, 1995
 Australia's Astronauts: Three Men and a Spaceflight Dream, 1999
 Teacher In Space: Christa McAuliffe and the Challenger Legacy, 2000, revised edition 2020
 Fallen Astronauts: Heroes Who Died Reaching for the Moon, with Kate Doolan, 2003. Revised expanded edition, 2016
 NASA's Scientist-Astronauts, with David Shayler, 2006
 Animals In Space: From Research Rockets to the Space Shuttle, with Chris Dubbs, 2007
 Into That Silent Sea: Trailblazers of the Space Era, 1961–1965, with Francis French, 2007
 In the Shadow of the Moon: A Challenging Journey to Tranquility, 1965–1969, with Francis French, 2007
 Astronomica, Ed. Fred Watson, 2007 (contributor)
 The First Soviet Cosmonaut Team: Their Lives and Legacies, with Rex Hall, 2009
 Australia's Astronauts: Countdown to a Spaceflight Dream, 2009
 Footprints in the Dust: The Epic Voyages of Apollo, 1969–1975, 2010 
 How Wickie Saved the World, 2010
 Selecting the Mercury Seven: The Search for America's First Astronauts, 2011
 Moon Bound: Choosing and Training the Lunar Astronauts, 2012
 Freedom 7: The Historic Flight of Alan B. Shepard, Jr., 2014
 Liberty Bell 7: The Suborbital Mercury Flight of Virgil I. Grissom, 2014
 Friendship 7: The Epic Orbital Flight of John H. Glenn, Jr., 2015
 Aurora 7: The Mercury Space Flight of M. Scott Carpenter, 2015
 Interkosmos: The Eastern Bloc's Early Space Program, 2015
 Sigma 7: The Six Mercury Orbits of Walter M. Schirra, Jr., 2016
 Faith 7: L. Gordon Cooper, Jr. and the Final Mercury Mission, 2016
 The Last of NASA's Original Pilot Astronauts: Expanding the Space Frontier in the Late Sixties, with David J. Shayler, 2017
 Shattered Dreams: The Lost or Canceled Space Missions, 2019
 NASA's First Space Shuttle Astronaut Selection: Redefining the Right Stuff, 2020
 Australia's Greatest Escapes: Gripping Tales of Wartime Bravery, 2020
 The Greatest Adventure: A History of Human Space Exploration, 2021
 Soviets in Space: Russia's Cosmonauts and the Space Frontier, 2022

References

External links
Into That Silent Sea Official Publisher Site
In The Shadow Of The Moon Official Publisher Site
2007 AAS Emme Award finalist announcements

1947 births
Australian non-fiction writers
Living people